Inwood/Love Field station is a DART Light Rail station in Dallas, Texas. The station opened as part of the Green Line's expansion in December 2010 and served as a stop on bus route 39 with service to Dallas Love Field. On December 3, 2012; route 39 was split at this station with the northern portion renumbered as 524, which was named "Love Link" as of December 2014. During construction, the station was planned to be named Inwood station.

References

External links 
Dallas Area Rapid Transit - Inwood/Love Field Station

Dallas Area Rapid Transit light rail stations in Dallas
Railway stations in the United States opened in 2010
Airport railway stations in the United States
Dallas Love Field
Railway stations in Dallas County, Texas